Jaime C. Bulatao (September 22, 1922 – February 10, 2015), called "Father Bu" by his students and coworkers, was a Filipino Jesuit priest and psychologist He is one of the co-founders of the Ateneo de Manila University's Department of Psychology and the Psychological Association of the Philippines.

Biography

Early life
Jaime “Jimmy” Carlos Bulatao was born in Paco, Manila on September 22, 1922. His father, Emilio Bulatao, headed the Physiology Department of the University of the Philippines College of Medicine. When his family fled from their Paco residence due to the carpet-bombing of the Philippines in the Second World War, Butatao's father allegedly brought with him nothing but his research papers. His mother, Encarnacion Ungson, was a public-school teacher before she married.  Bulatao had three older siblings: Josefine “Jo” Ungson Jayme, Rodolfo “Dodoy” Bulatao, and Elisa “Ely” Ungson Quizon. They grew up in Lingayen in the province of Pangasinan, where Bulatao was first taught by Belgian nuns and was at the top of his class.

Education
Bulatao attended St. Theresa's College in Manila for kindergarten. His parents wanted him to go to La Salle for grade school; however, he insisted on going to Ateneo Grade School against his parents' wishes. After further learning about the school, and meeting Fr. John Hurley, Bulatao's parents allowed him to attend.  He graduated high school in 1939 as a valedictorian. 

Hurley inspired him to become a Jesuit. He entered the Jesuit novitiate in Novaliches at the age of 16, leaving behind his 'childhood sweetheart,' Faley Honzales. He was ordained in 1952. Bulatao attended Woodstock College in New York, where he obtained a theology degree. For his post-graduate studies, Bulatao attended Fordham College in New York and received an MA in experimental psychology, and later a PhD in clinical psychology, with a focus on Comparative Physiological Psychology.

Languages 
Bulatao taught himself the basics of several languages, including French, Japanese, and conversational Chinese. During the 1980s, when the Philippines was under martial law, Bulatao helped save Psychology Department secretary Susan Cellano from Marcosian intelligence agents. The Marcosian intelligence agents were to pick up Cellano from Bellarmine Hall, and another secretary Nits del Rosario called Bulatao and asked him to help. She spoke in French so that the arresting agents did not understand their conversation. Bulatao went to the Psychology department and was able to protect Cellano from the agents.

Teaching 
Bulatao began teaching in 1946 at Ateneo before leaving to pursue his postgraduate studies at Fordham. Bulatao returned to the Philippines in 1960 and helped establish the Ateneo de Manila's Department of Psychology, where he taught for more than four decades. The department advised Bulatao to retire, but he refused. He held seminars in hypnosis, along with informal class sessions referred to as “Conversations with Father Bulatao.” He also helped found the Psychological Association of the Philippines. In 1964, he co-founded the Philippine Guidance and Personnel Association along with colleagues from various local universities. 

He was known for his hypnosis classes, in which he would tell his students to “fly” through astral travel. Ateneo School of Government dean Antonio La Viña, who drove Bulatao to wakes and parties, recalled: “Following that hypnotic voice, I once traveled to a friend's balcony and asked for forgiveness from that friend for having hurt her. And sure enough, a week or two later, a letter from that friend came, telling me I was forgiven.”

Mira Ofreneo, one of Bulatao's former students and the current dean of the Psychology Department, wrote a poem for him on 22 Sept. 2013 entitled “GURU”. The Psychological Association of the Philippines also named a teaching award in his honor.

Research and interest in the supernatural
Bulatao introduced the concept of group dynamics to the Philippines, and wrote The Technique of Group Discussion in 1965. He stressed the importance of understanding the Filipino psyche, undertaking studies on the psychology of Filipino culture and the phenomena surrounding spirituality and consciousness. As a clinical psychologist, Bulatao aimed to find the kind of therapy that worked best in the cultural context of the Philippines, experimenting with different alternatives that combined both his knowledge of Western methods and his understanding of the local culture.

Despite being a Catholic priest, Bulatao was known for his fascination with the mystical and supernatural. He was most interested in mediumship, hypnosis, and extra-sensory perception (ESP). His interest began when he visited Thailand during the early 70's where he was introduced to Buddhist monks and their meditation techniques. He began to search for a clinical explanation and to research the effects of this method on one's psyche with a focus on the Philippines. He was in contact with spiritistas (exorcists), faith-healers, and youths who were thought to be possessed. His focus on studying these phenomena was not readily accepted, but his work paved the way for the "Bulatao Method", which combined supernatural and theological questions. Bulatao regularly carried a pair of L-shaped dowsing rods he referred to as the “Rods of Moses," which he used to answer questions from students, as well as allegedly find concentration energy fields, and locate missing objects.

Later life and death 
In 2010, it was alleged that then-senator and presidential candidate, Benigno Aquino III, underwent a psychiatric evaluation by Bulatao in 1979 that showed he suffered from depression, which some claimed made him psychologically unfit to seek the presidency. This so-called "Bulatao Report" was released and spread through chain mail. Bulatao, however, denied that he wrote and signed the report, claiming it to be false.

By 2008, Bulatao had been diagnosed with both dementia and emphysema.

Bulatao died at Ateneo's Jesuit Residence on February 10, 2015, at 8:25PM after a four-day hospital stay. The University did not detail the cause of death. After a funeral Mass at Ateneo de Manila University's Church of Gesu that began on February 11, he was laid in the Sacred Heart Novitiate cemetery in Novaliches, Quezon City on February 14, 2015.

In a memo after Bulatao's death, the Psychology Department stated that although Bulatao received many awards for his contribution to psychology, he believed that his greatest achievement was teaching.

Awards and honors
Bulatao received several awards for his work.

 Achievement Awardee of the Philippine National Science Society (formerly NRCP) for 1987.
 National Social Scientist Awardee of the Philippine Social Science Council (PSSC) for 1990.
 Gawad ng Pagkilala by the Pambansang Samahan ng Sikolohiyang Pilipino for 1990.
 National Book Awardee for the Social Sciences by the Manila Critics Circle for 1992-1993.
 One of Quezon City's Most Outstanding Citizens for 2008
 President Emeritus Award from PGCA (Philippine Guidance and Counseling Association) in 2006

Published works

Hiya (1964)
The technique of group discussion (1965): A best-selling classic in group dynamics written with the Filipino personality in mind. It offers practical advice to those involved in organizations, clubs, seminars, business and leadership training programs, and other activities requiring group effort. Originally published in 1965. Eighth reprint, March 1999.
Split level Christianity (1966): He was also for his study on split-level Christianity in the Philippines, which is seen when Christians fail to walk their talk. In 1966, Bulatao defined it as “the coexistence within the same person of two or more thought-and-behavior systems which are inconsistent with each other. According to Bulatao: “So it is with the split-leveled person; at one level he professes allegiance to ideas, attitudes and ways of behaving which are mainly borrowed from the Christian West, at another level he holds convictions which are more properly his “own” ways of living and believing which were handed down from his ancestors, which do not always find their way into an explicit philosophical system, but nevertheless now and then flow into action.” Bulatao gave examples of inconsistency of values with behavior from how Filipinos dealt with pornography, infidelity and corruption. Bulatao also explained this split-level Christianity. He proposed that: “A study of the two levels may bring out the following analysis: the top or surface level is the more “Christian”part. “It is made up of rules and beliefs picked up in school or in church. In large part, it is conceptualized, or at least verbalized, usually in a foreign language like English, Spanish or Latin. Much of it is learned by rote, from catechism or from books.”Bulatao then argues that the lower or deeper level is made up of the rules, beliefs, attitudes and action tendencies which are more common in the environment, which are picked up at home and in the street rather than at school. “A large part of it is never verbalized, but acts as a sort of unspoken philosophy, spontaneously flowing into action when the occasion calls it forth and the inhibitory forces are removed.” Bulatao ends his article as a good Jesuit who has posed a problem does, by asking “what can be done about split-level Christianity? He quotes another Pope, Paul VI, who in his Encyclical, Ecclesiam Suam, says, “When the Church distinguishes itself from human nature, it does not oppose itself to it, but rather unites itself to it...The Church should enter into a dialogue with the world in which it exists and labors."
The finger abacus (1966)
The self and the group; theory and techniques of self-discovery groups (1967)
The Manileno's mainsprings (1970)
Inculturation, faith, and Christian life (1976–1978)
Phenomena and their interpretation: Landmark essays, 1957-1989 (1992): The book consists, first of all, of empirical excursions into infrequently charted territories of the Filipino soul. Drawn from keen, rigorous, and emphatic observation, these intricately sketched descriptions of various phenomena of our religion, consciousness, and culture, provide the reader with maps, as it were, of the Filipinos' outer and inner lives - as citizens of a particular history, on one had, and the other, as creatures of a timeless subjective, transpersonal universe.
Hypnosis and hypnotherapy (2000)
Therapeutic Tales: healing, hypnotherapy, and Father Bu (2010): The book is a compilation of articles written bu therapists, counselors, teachers and students of psychology. All the contributors have, at one time or another, been students in Bulatao's classes.
Consciousness mapping: exploring your relationships through the star matrix (2010): Consciousness maps, according to Bulatao, are "maps of human relationships, especially of relationships that come from the distant past and are deeply etched in our heart and mind. It begins to take form at birth as a baby reaches for his mother's breast" and becomes more varied and intense as the child grows. If one is to understand a person fully, one must tap into this person's consciousness. Every page of this book guides us on how this can be done. - Edna Franco, Ph.D., Associate Professor, Department of Psychology, Ateneo de Manila University.
Learning to Learn (2019): "Father Bu is a brilliant psychologist who combines the rigorous thinking of the scientist with the creative mind of the artist. The stories he tells of his childhood include playing for hours with his sister, exploring, experimenting, asking questions about things around him, and looking for the answers.  He fondly recalls hypnotizing a chicken, taking care of a pet rooster, pulling a crab shell backwards to which a string is attached. In all these, he says that his father was there enjoying with him, encouraging him to play, to dare, to explore, to experiment, to discover.  His father was instrumental in helping shape the mind of one of the few original thinkers in the field. From this, we learn the crucial role that parents play in encouraging independent free and creative thinking in their children by allowing and encouraging them to play, to ask questions, to experiment and explore." Ma. Lourdes A. Carandang, Ph.D., National Social Scientist (1995). https://bac-lac.on.worldcat.org/oclc/1129442036

References

External links
 Ateneno Bulatao Center for Psychological Services

1922 births
2015 deaths
Filipino psychologists
20th-century Filipino Jesuits
People from Paco, Manila
Academic staff of Ateneo de Manila University
Woodstock College alumni
Fordham University alumni